Blue Is the Colour is the fifth studio album from English band The Beautiful South, released in October 1996 through Go! Discs and in America through Ark 21 Records. The album was released following the two singles "Pretenders to the Throne" and "Dream a Little Dream", which never featured on any album until the release of the second greatest hits Solid Bronze in 2001.

The album continued the melancholic tone of its predecessor Miaow, and is generally considered to be the band's darkest effort, reflecting Heaton's life at the time. This comes across in songs such as "Liars’ Bar" (about alcoholism), "The Sound of North America" (a sarcastic look at capitalism), "Mirror" (Prostitution), "Blackbird on the Wire", "Have Fun" (which Heaton has cited as his saddest song), and the self-explanatory "Alone".

The album spawned 4 singles, the first being "Rotterdam", which peaked at No. 5 in the charts in September 1996. The follow ups were "Don't Marry Her" which reached No. 8 in December, "Blackbird on the Wire", which got to No. 23 in March 1997 and finally the single "Liar's Bar" which just missed the Top 40 in June.  On "Liars' Bar", Paul Heaton's vocal consciously imitates the style of Tom Waits, while in "Alone" the bass line serves as another allusion to him. The album itself topped the album charts on 2 November 1996.

Track listing
All tracks by Paul Heaton & Dave Rotheray (except where noted)

 "Don't Marry Her" – 3:23
 "Little Blue" – 3:17
 "Mirror" – 4:05
 "Blackbird on the Wire" – 4:57
 "The Sound of North America" – 4:02
 "Have Fun" – 4:44
 "Liars' Bar" – 5:53
 "Rotterdam (or Anywhere)" – 3:37
 "Foundations" – 2:44
 "Artificial Flowers" – 3:58 (Sheldon Harnick & Jerry Bock)
 "One God" – 4:12
 "Alone" – 4:58

B-sides
As was their usual modus operandi, The Beautiful South included unreleased material on the B-sides of the singles taken from their albums.

from the "Rotterdam" CD5
"Rotterdam" (single version)
"A Minute's Silence"
"Pollard"

from the "Don't Marry Her" CD1
"Don't Marry Her" (clean version)
"God Bless The Child" (Arthur Herzog, Jr. & Billie Holiday)
"Without Her" (Harry Nilsson)

from the "Don't Marry Her" CD2
"Don't Marry Her" (clean version)
"Dream A Little Dream" aka "Dream a Little Dream of Me") (music by Fabian Andre & Wilbur Schwandt, lyrics by Gus Kahn)
"Les Yeux Ouverts"* (music by Fabian Andre & Wilbur Schwandt, French lyrics by Brice Homs & Kurin Ternovizeff)
Note: The French version of "Dream a Little Dream of Me" ("Les Yeux Ouverts") was recorded for the movie French Kiss. It was re-used in the film  The Devil Wears Prada.

from the "Blackbird on the Wire" CD1
"Blackbird on the Wire"
"Lean on Me" (Bill Withers) (featuring Paul with the London Community Gospel Choir from Later... with Jools Holland 24 Dec 1996)
"You Just Can't Smile It Away" (Bill Withers) (featuring Paul with Jools Holland and Courtney Pine from Later... with Jools Holland 12 March 1994)
from the "Blackbird on the Wire" CD2
"Blackbird on the Wire" (featuring Jools Holland on piano, taken from Later... with Jools Holland Special)
"I'll Sail This Ship Alone" (taken from Later... with Jools Holland Special)
"The Sound of North America" (featuring The Black Dyke Mills Band, taken from Later... with Jools Holland Special)

from the "Liars’ Bar" CD1
"Liars' Bar" (remix, featuring The Black Dyke Mills Band, taken from Later... with Jools Holland Special)
"Dumb" (an earlier, shorter version with an expletive.  Re-recorded for the 1998 single on Quench, adding a bridge and replacing the expletive)
"You've Done Nothing Wrong" (Iris DeMent) (with Jools Holland (piano) and Iris DeMent (vocals), taken from Later... with Jools Holland Special) 
from the "Liar's Bar" CD2
"Liars' Bar" (live remix, featuring The Black Dyke Mills Band, taken from Later... with Jools Holland Special)
"The Opening of a New Book"
"Hold on To What?" (taken from Later... with Jools Holland Special)

Personnel
The Beautiful South
 Paul Heaton – vocals
 Dave Hemingway – vocals
 Jacqui Abbott – vocals
 Dave Rotheray – guitar
 Sean Welch – bass
 Dave Stead – drums
Additional musicians 
 Damon Butcher – Keyboards, Programming, String Arrangements
 Martin Ditcham – Percussion
 Andy Duncan – Percussion, Programming
Technical
 John Brough – Producer, engineer
 Jon Kelly – Producer
 Ryan Art – Design
 Art Murphy – Paintings, Cover Painting
 Lawrence Watson – Photography

Charts

Weekly charts

Year-end charts

Certifications

References

1996 albums
The Beautiful South albums
Albums produced by Jon Kelly
Go! Discs albums